Georg Zachariades was an Austrian industrialist, figure skater and racing cyclist of Greek descent. 

Competing in men's singles for Germany, he won the bronze medals at the 1892 and 1893 European Figure Skating Championships.

Competitive highlights

References 

German male single skaters
Date of birth missing
Date of death missing
German people of Greek descent